Allahabad is a village and union council of Hub Tehsil in the  Lasbela District of Balochistan province, Pakistan.

References

Union councils of Lasbela District
Populated places in Lasbela District